Ayni (Quechua and Aymara also spelled Ayniy or Aini) can refer to either the concept of reciprocity or mutualism among people of the Andean mountain communities or the practice of this concept. As a noun, the law of ayni states that everything in the world is connected, and is the only commandment that rules daily life in many communities like the Q'ero. As a verb, this often refers to the cooperation between the members of a community when one member gives to another, he or she is entitled to receive something back. Well-known practitioners of Ayni include the Quechuas and Aymara, as well as numerous other tribes that live in the Peru, Ecuador, and Bolivia.

Ayni as a noun 
In communities like the Q'ero, five principles define the Andean way of life: munay (to love), yachay (to learn, know, and remember), llan'kay (to work), kawsay (life), and ayni (reciprocity). Among them, ayni is regarded as the most important principle, as it provides the backbone of life. This is because ayni is not limited to being compensated for earlier help; a more broad definition of ayni would be the exchange of energy between humans, nature, and the universe.

An example of this would be ayni between a human and a tree: A tree is watered by a human, and the tree uses this water to convert carbon dioxide into oxygen and glucose. The oxygen is used by humans to perform respiration and survive, and some glucose may eventually find its way into products that humans use such as fruits. In return, humans convert oxygen back to carbon dioxide for use by the tree, as well as plant seeds the tree produced to create more trees. The simple of act of watering a tree can also reap in rewards including by not limited to: creating shade, wind barriers, soil anchors, and more. The relationships that can be defined as ayni thus extend to everything beneficial involving two parties.

Ayni as a verb 
In practice, Quechua and Aymara communities apply ayni through human to human interaction. This is thought to have originated from the harsh climate of the Andean mountain region and the mutualism thus demanded for the survival of the people living there.

Members of a community help other members for private purposes when support is needed for activities such as construction and planting.  Participants are supplied with food and drink by the hosting party. The party that was helped returns the favor by assisting those who helped them or others in need of aid, completing the reciprocity.

This is not to be confused with Mink'a, also native to the Andean region, in which participants are typically paid for services such as harvesting crops.

Similar Concepts 

There are many concepts globally that show similarly to ayni. While none of them are exactly the same as ayni, they all show mutualism to a certain extent.
 Barn raising (North American)
 Bayanihan (Filipino)
 Bee (North American, Australian)
 Dugnad (Norwegian)
 Gadugi (Cherokee)
 Kaláka (Hungarian)
 Gotong-royong (Indonesian, Malaysian)
 Harambee (Kenyan)
 Imece (Turkish)
 Meitheal (Irish)
 Mink'a (Andean)
 Moba (Serbian)
 Naffir (Sudanese)
 Talkoot (Finnish)

References 

Inca
Indigenous culture of the Andes
Mutualism (movement)
Quechua words and phrases